Roundway Down and Covert is an 86 hectare biological Site of Special Scientific Interest near Devizes in Wiltshire, England. It was notified in 1971.

Roundway Down was the site of a battle in 1643 during the Civil War, hence the Iron Age hillfort within the site is known locally as Oliver's Castle or Oliver's Camp.

Sources
 English Nature citation sheet for the site (accessed 14 August 2006)

References

External links
 English Nature website (SSSI information)

Sites of Special Scientific Interest in Wiltshire
Sites of Special Scientific Interest notified in 1971